Baron André Edourd Jolly (Brussel, 13 April 1799–Brussel, 3 December 1883) was a Belgian engineer, painter, military official and politician.

He was member of the Provisional Government of Belgium (1830). Commandant of the Royal Headquarters, 1831 and Commissaris-General of War.

He was married to Elizabeth Armytage, daughter of George Armytage. Their son Baron Eugène Oscar Jolly was member of the Belgian senate.

Honours 
 : Iron Cross.
 : Grand Cordon in the Order of Leopold.
 : Knight in the Legion of Honour.

References

Nobility from Brussels
1799 births
1883 deaths
19th-century Belgian engineers
Belgian Army officers
Belgian painters
Politicians  from Brussels
Engineers from Brussels
Place of birth missing
Military personnel from Brussels